Rakan may refer to:
In arabic, Rakan means noble. 
Radekan, Qazvin, a village in Iran that is also called "Rakan"
In Japanese, the word for an Arhat, in Buddhism, a saint or person who has attained nirvana

See also
 
 
 Rakan-ji, a Sōtō temple in Nakatsu, Oita Prefecture, Japan